Ruszów  is a village in the administrative district of Gmina Węgliniec, within Zgorzelec County, Lower Silesian Voivodeship, in south-western Poland. Ruszów is within the historic Upper Lusatia, homeland of Lusatian Sorbs.

The village has an approximate population of 2,000.

During World War II the Germans established and operated a subcamp of the Gross-Rosen concentration camp in the village, whose prisoners were Jews.

In the final stages of World War II, a temporary hospital of the Second Polish Army was located in the village.

Gallery

References

Villages in Zgorzelec County